The 1930 U.S. Open was the 34th U.S. Open, held July 10–12 at Interlachen Country Club in Edina, Minnesota, a suburb southwest of Minneapolis. Bobby Jones won his second consecutive and record-tying fourth U.S. Open title. Having already won the British Amateur and the British Open in June, Jones secured his third consecutive major title of the single-season at the U.S. Open. He completed the grand slam with a victory in late September at Merion in the fourth and final leg, the U.S. Amateur.

The 1930 U.S. Open was played in oppressive heat, and the first round on Thursday saw Macdonald Smith and 1927 champion Tommy Armour share the lead, with Jones a stroke behind. Jones was one-under through eight holes in his second round when he hit one of his most famous shots: the "lily pad shot." Jones was attempting to reach the par-5 9th in two shots when two spectators ran onto the fairway during his swing. He mishit the ball toward the lake where it fell about twenty yards short of dry ground. Incredibly, the ball skipped off a lily pad and onto the far bank, just thirty yards short of the green. Jones would get up-and-down for an unlikely birdie, one that only added to his growing legend. Jones finished the round with a 73, putting him at 144 in a tie for second, two strokes behind leader Horton Smith.

Jones took command over the final two rounds on Saturday; he shot 68 in the third round in the morning and started the final round with a front-nine 38. However, he ran into trouble with a bogey at 12 and a double bogey at 13. Now leading Smith by only one shot, Jones birdied 14 and 16. Instead, he holed out for birdie and a two-stroke victory over Smith, who claimed the $1,000 winner's share of the $5,000 purse as the top professional. In third place was 36-hole leader Horton Smith, who won the first edition of Jones' "Augusta National Invitation Tournament" in 1934, later known as the Masters Tournament, and again in 1936.

Jones became the first to successfully defend his Open title since John McDermott in 1911–12. He was now tied with Willie Anderson with four Open titles, but he would not attempt to win a fifth. Only four have won consecutive U.S. Opens since: Ralph Guldahl (1937, 1938), Ben Hogan (1950, 1951), Curtis Strange (1988, 1989), and Brooks Koepka (2017, 2018). After completing the Grand Slam with his U.S. Amateur win, Jones retired from competitive golf at age 28.

Past champions in the field 

Source:

 All former champions in the field made the cut

Round summaries

First round
Thursday, July 10, 1930

Source:

Second round
Friday, July 11, 1930

Source:

Third round
Saturday, July 12, 1930 (morning)

Source:

Final round
Saturday, July 12, 1930 (afternoon)

Source:
(a) denotes amateur

References

External links
USGA Championship Database
USOpen.com - 1930

U.S. Open (golf)
Golf in Minnesota
Edina, Minnesota
U.S. Open
U.S. Open
U.S. Open
U.S. Open